The 2009 Women's Premier League Rugby Final was held in San Francisco, California from November 6-8. New York R. C. were the eventual winners with Berkeley All Blues as runners-up in the Cup competition.

Match

References 

Women's Premier League Rugby Finals
Women's Premier League Rugby Final
Sports competitions in San Francisco